Liberty is a census-designated place in Weber County, Utah, United States. The population was 1,257 at the 2010 census. It is part of the Ogden–Clearfield, Utah Metropolitan Statistical Area, as well as the Ogden Valley census county division.

Geography
Near Liberty are Nordic Valley, Utah State Route 158, and the Nordic Valley ski resort. To the southeast, just past Eden, are Pineview Reservoir and the town of Huntsville. Avon Road, formerly State Route 162, leads north over the Avon Pass to Avon.

History
British trapper and explorer Peter Skene Ogden was the first European to map and describe the "Ogden Hole" valley which would later include Liberty. The Liberty area was settled beginning in 1859 as an outgrowth of Eden. In 1892, a separate townsite was laid out and a separate ward of the Church of Jesus Christ of Latter-day Saints organized. The name came from John Freeman's remarks that both cattle and people took "full liberty" in the area.

Settlement happened gradually, homes built one at a time rather than in tract housing. Traditionally a farming and ranching community, Liberty has developed in recent years into a recreational community and commuter town for the Ogden area.

Demographics
As of the census of 2010, there were 1,257 people living in the CDP. There were 437 housing units. The racial makeup of the CDP was 96.2% White, 1.0% Asian, 0.7% American Indian and Alaska Native, 0.1% Native Hawaiian and other Pacific Islander, 0.9% from some other race, and 1.2% from two or more races. Hispanic or Latino of any race were 2.5% of the population.

Education
Liberty is part of the Weber School District, but has no schools of its own. Students attend elementary and junior high schools in Eden, and Weber High School in Pleasant View.

Notable people
 David Eccles, Utah's first multimillionaire; his family lived in Liberty briefly after immigrating from Scotland in 1863
 Casey Snider, member of the Utah House of Representatives

See also

 List of census-designated places in Utah

References

External links

Census-designated places in Utah
Census-designated places in Weber County, Utah